Mitchell or Mitch Lewis may also refer to:
Mitchell Lewis (actor) (1880–1956), American film actor
Mitch Lewis (born 1954), Canadian multi-instrumentalist
Mitchell Lewis (footballer) (born 1998), Australian footballer

See also
Mitchell (automobile), manufactured by Mitchell-Lewis Motor Company
Mitchell Lewis Building, a historic building in Racine, Wisconsin
Lewis Mitchell (1847–1930), Native American member of the Maine state legislature